Rémy Isoré was a French Jesuit priest, he was martyred during Boxer Rebellion in China. He was declared a Saint by Pope John Paul II in 2000.

Early life and education 
Isore was born in Bambecque, France on 22 January 1852. He studied to become a priest for his own diocese in the diocesan seminary at Cambrai. He decided to join Jesuits and so joined the Jesuit seminary at Saint-Acheul. He taught in the secondary school and also studied Theology in Jersey.

Mission in China 
Remy had asked his superiors to send him to Zambia, but he was sent to China to evangelize. He arrived in China in 1882. On 31 July 1886, Isore was ordained a priest of the Society of Jesus. After ordination he worked in many different roles in China.

Martyrdom 
Isore was stationed at Weixian, in Zhili, Tianjin at the time of rise of Boxer Rebellion. After hearing news of the rebels heading to his parish, he went to the nearby Jesuit mission in village of Wuyi. Father Modeste Andlauer was incharge of this mission. Next afternoon, on 19 July 1900, Father Andlaeur and Father Isore were beheaded by the rebels while kneeling and praying. Their heads were displayed at the village entrance gate as a warning message for other Christians.

Canonization 
Father Isore was beatified by Pius XII on 17 April 1956 and canonized by Pope John Paul II on 1 Oct 2000 along with other martyrs of china.

References 

1852 births
Jesuit saints
Catholic saints
French missionaries
1900 deaths
Catholic martyrs
Christian martyrs
Canonizations by Pope John Paul II